"Breathe, Stretch, Shake" is the second single released from Mase's third album, Welcome Back. It was released on September 14, 2004, produced by Rick Rock and featured P. Diddy on the chorus. "Breathe, Stretch, Shake" was slightly more successful on the Billboard charts than the album's previous single, "Welcome Back", peaking at 28 on the Billboard Hot 100. It was certified gold on June 27, 2005, just about a month after "Welcome Back" accomplished the feat.

Music video
The video features Mase alongside a crew of female backup dancers both dressed in black and white in both black and white-colored backgrounds. The video was directed by Benny Boom.

In popular culture
This song was also featured in the 2004 sports video game NFL Street 2 and the movie version of Fat Albert.

Formats and track listing
UK 12" (promo)
A. "Breathe, Stretch, Shake" – 3:17
B. "Breathe, Stretch, Shake" (Instrumental) – 3:17

UK CD (promo)
1. "Breathe, Stretch, Shake" – 3:17

US 12"
A1. "Welcome Back" – 4:22
A2. "Welcome Back" (Instrumental) – 4:22
B1. "Breathe, Stretch, Shake" (featuring P. Diddy) – 3:17
B2. "Breathe, Stretch, Shake" (Instrumental) – 3:17

US 12" (promo)
A1. "Breathe, Stretch, Shake" (featuring P.Diddy) – 3:17
A2. "My Harlem Lullaby" – 3:54
B1. "Welcome Back" – 4:22
B2. Keep It On" – 3:34

US CD (promo)
1. "Breathe, Stretch, Shake" – 3:17
2. "Breathe, Stretch, Shake" (Instrumental) – 3:17

Charts

Weekly charts

Year-end charts

Certifications

Release history

References

2004 singles
2004 songs
Mase songs
Sean Combs songs
Bad Boy Records singles
Universal Records singles
Songs written by Mase
Songs written by Rick Rock